"The Only Way Out" is a song recorded by English singer Cliff Richard, released in 1982 as the lead-single for his album Now You See Me, Now You Don't. The song was written by British guitarist Ray Martinez. The song reached number 10 in the UK Singles Chart and reached the top 20 in Australia, Belgium, Finland, Ireland, the Netherlands and Switzerland.

Chart performance

Weekly charts

Year-end charts

References

External links
 

Cliff Richard songs
1982 singles
1982 songs